Tighina County was a county (Romanian: județ) in Moldova from 1998 to 2003. It bordered Ukraine, Lăpușna County, Chișinău County, and Transnistria. Its de jure capital was the city of Tighina, but due to the Transnistria situation, the de facto capital was Căușeni.

Tighina County had 93 localities, of which four had city status: Tighina, Căușeni, Căinari, and Ștefan Vodă.

References

 Counties of Moldova, Statoids.com

Counties of Moldova
Counties of Bessarabia
1998 establishments in Moldova
2003 disestablishments in Moldova
States and territories established in 1998
States and territories disestablished in 2003